USS LST-990 was an  in the United States Navy. Like many of her class, she was not named and is properly referred to by her hull designation.

LST-990 was laid down on 26 February 1944 at the Boston Navy Yard; launched on 27 March 1944; and commissioned on 1 May 1944.

Service history
During World War II, LST-990 was assigned to the Asiatic-Pacific theater and participated in the following operations; capture and occupation of southern Palau Islands (September and October 1944), Leyte landings (October and November 1944), Zambales-Subic Bay (January 1945), assault and occupation of Okinawa Gunto (March through June 1945).
 
Following the war, LST-990 performed occupation duty in the Far East until early December 1945. She returned to the United States and was decommissioned on 10 July 1946 and struck from the Navy list on 25 September that same year. On 26 September 1947, the ship was sold to the Boston Metals Co., of Baltimore, Maryland, for scrapping.

LST-990 earned four battle stars for World War II service.

References

LST-542-class tank landing ships
World War II amphibious warfare vessels of the United States
Ships built in Boston
1944 ships